Apostolos may refer to:

 The Apostolos (Eastern Orthodox liturgy), a book containing texts traditionally believed to be authored by one of the twelve apostles (disciples) – various epistles and the Acts of the Apostles – from which one is selected to be read during service
 Apostolos (given name)
 The Greek for apostle
 Apostolos (surname)